New Zealand is party to several free-trade agreements (FTAs) worldwide.

History
The Economy of New Zealand is a market economy which is greatly dependent on international trade, mainly with Australia, the United States of America, China and Japan. It is strongly dependent on tourism and agricultural exports, and has only small manufacturing and high-tech components. Economic free-market reforms of the last decades have removed many barriers to foreign investment, and the World Bank has praised New Zealand as being the most business-friendly country in the world.
Regional and bilateral free trade agreements have become an important part of New Zealand's international trade policy. New Zealand has used free trade agreements also known as closer economic partnerships to liberalise trade between economies. A Closer Economic Partnership Agreement with Thailand was negotiated in 2004 and implemented in 2005. Negotiations for a Free Trade Agreement with Chile, Brunei and Singapore known as the Trans-Pacific Strategic Economic Partnership were concluded in 2005. Negotiations for further agreements with Malaysia were undertaken in 2006, but failed to reach a conclusion. The historic FTA with China was signed in Beijing in April 2008.

On 27 February 2009 New Zealand and its close partner Australia signed a Free Trade Agreement with the ASEAN regional block of 10 countries. It is estimated that an FTA with ASEAN would boost aggregate GDP across the 12 countries by more than US$48 billion over the period 2000–2020 with an additional US$3.4 billion to New Zealand alone.

Free Trade Agreements in force
Here is a list of free trade agreements of which New Zealand is part. In parentheses, the abbreviation, if applicable, membership if not stated before, and the date of coming into force are to be seen.

Bilateral agreements

 : Closer Economic Relations (1983)
 : New Zealand–China Free Trade Agreement (2008)
 : New Zealand–Hong Kong, China Closer Economic Partnership (2011)
 : Malaysia–New Zealand Free Trade Agreement announced on 2 June 2009
 : New Zealand and Singapore Closer Economic Partnership (2001)
 : NZ-Korea Free Trade Agreement (2015)
 : Agreement between New Zealand and the Separate Customs Territory of Taiwan, Penghu, Kinmen, and Matsu on Economic Cooperation (2013)
 : New Zealand and Thailand Closer Economic Partnership (2005)
 : New Zealand-United Kingdom Free Trade agreement (2021, to be brought into force by end of 2022)

Multilateral agreements

 Trans-Pacific Strategic Economic Partnership (2005), with:
  (2005)
  (2005)
 : (2005) – Auxiliary to the bilateral New Zealand and Singapore Closer Economic Partnership
  Association of Southeast Asian Nations: ASEAN Australia NZ FTA (2009)
 Comprehensive and Progressive Agreement for Trans-Pacific Partnership (2018), with:
 
 
 
 
 
 
 
 
 
  
 Regional Comprehensive Economic Partnership (2022), with:
 
 
 
 
 
 
 
 
 
 
 
: New Zealand-European Union Free Trade Agreement (2022, to be brought into force by end of 2024)

Proposed Free Trade Agreements

New Zealand is negotiating bilateral and multilateral free trade agreements with the following blocs and countries:

 : New Zealand - Pacific Alliance – negotiating since 2017 
 : New Zealand-Mercosur Free Trade Agreement – negotiating since 2010 
 : Negotiations began in 2007 and concluded in 2009 but the agreement is not yet in force 
  India–New Zealand Free Trade Agreement – negotiating since 2007 with the establishment of a JSG (Joint Study Group) looking at the feasibility of an Indian-NZ FTA.
  Russia-Kazakhstan-Belarus Free Trade Agreement – negotiations began in 2010 but are currently suspended
  Russia-Kazakhstan-Belarus New Zealand Free Trade Agreement – negotiations began in 2010 but are currently suspended
  Russia-Kazakhstan-Belarus Free Trade Agreement – negotiations began in 2010 but are currently suspended

Abandoned or superseded proposals

 The Trans-Pacific Strategic Economic Partnership, a multilateral trade agreement involving 4 countries with which New Zealand has existing trade agreements – Malaysia, Brunei, Chile, Singapore, and Australia – and nations with which New Zealand does not have an existing FTA:
: New Zealand–United States Free Trade Agreement. These negotiations resulted in the United States signing but not ratifying the now-defunct Trans-Pacific Partnership.
: Negotiated alongside the United States, Australia and Vietnam to join the Trans-Pacific Strategic Economic Partnership. Became part of the Comprehensive and Progressive Agreement for Trans-Pacific Partnership.
 : Negotiated alongside the United States, Australia and Peru to join the Trans-Pacific Strategic Economic Partnership. Became part of the Comprehensive and Progressive Agreement for Trans-Pacific Partnership.
 : Conducting feasibility study as of (14 May 2008). Superseded as Japan joined the Comprehensive and Progressive Agreement for Trans-Pacific Partnership.

See also
 United States free trade agreements

References

External links
 New Zealand Ministry of Foreign Affairs and Trade – Official site
 Ministry of Economic Development New Zealand – Official site
Tariff Finder, Ministry of Foreign Affarirs and Trade - Tool to find export and import tariffs 

Free trade agreements of New Zealand